Poprad Landscape Park (Popradzki Park Krajobrazowy) is a protected area (Landscape Park) in southern Poland, named after the Poprad river running through it.

It lies within Lesser Poland Voivodeship, in the part of the Beskid mountain range called Western Carpathians south of Nowy Sącz, in the basin of the Poprad river with its picturesque gorge. It borders Slovakia.

Notes and references

Poprad
Parks in Lesser Poland Voivodeship